Estadio Lautaro is a stadium in Buin, Santiago Metropolitan Region. It is currently used mostly for football matches and is the home stadium of Lautaro de Buin. 

The stadium holds 3,700 people.

References

Lautaro
Lautaro
1967 establishments in Chile
Sports venues completed in 1967